McGregor is a city in Aitkin County, Minnesota, United States. The population was 391 at the 2010 census.

McGregor is located along Minnesota State Highways 65 and 210. Other routes include Aitkin County Road 8, Maddy Street.

History
McGregor was incorporated in 1903, and separated from surrounding McGregor Township in 1919. McGregor was named either for a hunter and trapper named McGregor who came from New York, or for Major John G. MacGregor of Minneapolis. The post office began in 1890.

Geography

The Sandy River flows nearby. The Soo Line North ATV Trail is also nearby.

Demographics

2010 census
As of the census of 2010, there were 391 people, 180 households, and 99 families living in the city. The racial makeup of the city was 95.1% White, 0.3% African American, 4.1% Native American, 0.3% from other races, and 0.3% from two or more races. Hispanic or Latino of any race were 0.5% of the population.

There were 180 households, of which 27.8% had children under the age of 18 living with them, 34.4% were married couples living together, 13.9% had a female householder with no husband present, 6.7% had a male householder with no wife present, and 45.0% were non-families. 41.7% of all households were made up of individuals, and 21.1% had someone living alone who was 65 years of age or older. The average household size was 2.17 and the average family size was 2.91.

The median age in the city was 43.3 years. 23% of residents were under the age of 18; 7.8% were between the ages of 18 and 24; 23% were from 25 to 44; 23.4% were from 45 to 64; and 22.8% were 65 years of age or older. The gender makeup of the city was 46.5% male and 53.5% female.

2000 census
As of the census of 2000, there were 404 people, 182 households, and 105 families living in the city. The racial makeup of the city was 95.54% White, 0.50% African American, 3.22% Native American, 0.50% from other races, and 0.25% from two or more races. Hispanic or Latino of any race were 0.50% of the population. 30.1% were of German, 17.0% Finnish, 16.7% Norwegian, 5.9% Swedish and 5.2% American ancestry according to Census 2000.

There were 182 households, out of which 27.5% had children under the age of 18 living with them, 39.6% were married couples living together, 14.3% had a female householder with no husband present, and 41.8% were non-families. 39.6% of all households were made up of individuals, and 22.0% had someone living alone who was 65 years of age or older.  The average household size was 2.22 and the average family size was 2.93.

In the city, the population was spread out, with 26.7% under the age of 18, 9.9% from 18 to 24, 20.8% from 25 to 44, 21.5% from 45 to 64, and 21.0% who were 65 years of age or older.  The median age was 38 years. For every 100 females, there were 83.6 males.  For every 100 females age 18 and over, there were 83.9 males.

The median income for a household in the city was $24,318, and the median income for a family was $30,625. Males had a median income of $27,125 versus $16,607 for females. The per capita income for the city was $13,167.  About 6.8% of families and 13.7% of the population were below the poverty line, including 8.8% of those under age 18 and 17.3% of those age 65 or over.

References

External links
McGregor Photo Gallery

Cities in Aitkin County, Minnesota
Cities in Minnesota